The 1951–52 New York Rangers season was the franchise's 26th season. The Rangers compiled a 23–34–13 record during the regular season, and finished with 59 points. Their fifth-place finish caused them to miss the NHL playoffs.

Regular season

Final standings

Record vs. opponents

Schedule and results

|- align="center" bgcolor="#FFBBBB"
| 1 || 14 || @ Chicago Black Hawks || 3–2 || 0–1–0
|- align="center" bgcolor="#FFBBBB"
| 2 || 18 || @ Montreal Canadiens || 3–2 || 0–2–0
|- align="center" bgcolor="#CCFFCC"
| 3 || 20 || @ Toronto Maple Leafs || 3–2 || 1–2–0
|- align="center" bgcolor="white"
| 4 || 21 || @ Boston Bruins || 1–1 || 1–2–1
|- align="center" bgcolor="#FFBBBB"
| 5 || 24 || Boston Bruins || 3–1 || 1–3–1
|- align="center" bgcolor="#CCFFCC"
| 6 || 28 || Montreal Canadiens || 2–1 || 2–3–1
|- align="center" bgcolor="#FFBBBB"
| 7 || 29 || @ Montreal Canadiens || 6–1 || 2–4–1
|-

|- align="center" bgcolor="#FFBBBB"
| 8 || 1 || @ Chicago Black Hawks || 4–2 || 2–5–1
|- align="center" bgcolor="#CCFFCC"
| 9 || 3 || @ Toronto Maple Leafs || 2–1 || 3–5–1
|- align="center" bgcolor="#FFBBBB"
| 10 || 4 || @ Detroit Red Wings || 4–2 || 3–6–1
|- align="center" bgcolor="white"
| 11 || 7 || Detroit Red Wings || 4–4 || 3–6–2
|- align="center" bgcolor="#CCFFCC"
| 12 || 11 || Chicago Black Hawks || 3–2 || 4–6–2
|- align="center" bgcolor="white"
| 13 || 14 || Toronto Maple Leafs || 2–2 || 4–6–3
|- align="center" bgcolor="#FFBBBB"
| 14 || 17 || @ Montreal Canadiens || 3–2 || 4–7–3
|- align="center" bgcolor="#FFBBBB"
| 15 || 18 || Detroit Red Wings || 5–2 || 4–8–3
|- align="center" bgcolor="white"
| 16 || 21 || Boston Bruins || 3–3 || 4–8–4
|- align="center" bgcolor="#FFBBBB"
| 17 || 22 || @ Detroit Red Wings || 2–1 || 4–9–4
|- align="center" bgcolor="#CCFFCC"
| 18 || 25 || Montreal Canadiens || 2–1 || 5–9–4
|- align="center" bgcolor="white"
| 19 || 27 || @ Boston Bruins || 1–1 || 5–9–5
|- align="center" bgcolor="#CCFFCC"
| 20 || 28 || Chicago Black Hawks || 6–3 || 6–9–5
|-

|- align="center" bgcolor="#FFBBBB"
| 21 || 1 || @ Toronto Maple Leafs || 8–2 || 6–10–5
|- align="center" bgcolor="#FFBBBB"
| 22 || 2 || @ Chicago Black Hawks || 6–4 || 6–11–5
|- align="center" bgcolor="#FFBBBB"
| 23 || 5 || Boston Bruins || 3–2 || 6–12–5
|- align="center" bgcolor="#CCFFCC"
| 24 || 9 || Toronto Maple Leafs || 7–2 || 7–12–5
|- align="center" bgcolor="#FFBBBB"
| 25 || 11 || @ Boston Bruins || 4–2 || 7–13–5
|- align="center" bgcolor="#CCFFCC"
| 26 || 12 || Boston Bruins || 6–3 || 8–13–5
|- align="center" bgcolor="#FFBBBB"
| 27 || 15 || @ Toronto Maple Leafs || 4–1 || 8–14–5
|- align="center" bgcolor="#FFBBBB"
| 28 || 16 || Detroit Red Wings || 3–1 || 8–15–5
|- align="center" bgcolor="#CCFFCC"
| 29 || 19 || Montreal Canadiens || 4–2 || 9–15–5
|- align="center" bgcolor="#CCFFCC"
| 30 || 23 || Chicago Black Hawks || 3–2 || 10–15–5
|- align="center" bgcolor="#FFBBBB"
| 31 || 25 || @ Detroit Red Wings || 2–1 || 10–16–5
|- align="center" bgcolor="#CCFFCC"
| 32 || 26 || Detroit Red Wings || 1–0 || 11–16–5
|- align="center" bgcolor="#FFBBBB"
| 33 || 29 || @ Montreal Canadiens || 7–2 || 11–17–5
|- align="center" bgcolor="white"
| 34 || 30 || Toronto Maple Leafs || 2–2 || 11–17–6
|-

|- align="center" bgcolor="#CCFFCC"
| 35 || 1 || @ Boston Bruins || 4–2 || 12–17–6
|- align="center" bgcolor="#CCFFCC"
| 36 || 2 || Detroit Red Wings || 1–0 || 13–17–6
|- align="center" bgcolor="#CCFFCC"
| 37 || 6 || Chicago Black Hawks || 3–2 || 14–17–6
|- align="center" bgcolor="#FFBBBB"
| 38 || 9 || Toronto Maple Leafs || 2–1 || 14–18–6
|- align="center" bgcolor="#FFBBBB"
| 39 || 10 || @ Detroit Red Wings || 5–2 || 14–19–6
|- align="center" bgcolor="white"
| 40 || 13 || Montreal Canadiens || 2–2 || 14–19–7
|- align="center" bgcolor="#FFBBBB"
| 41 || 16 || Chicago Black Hawks || 6–4 || 14–20–7
|- align="center" bgcolor="white"
| 42 || 17 || @ Chicago Black Hawks || 6–6 || 14–20–8
|- align="center" bgcolor="#CCFFCC"
| 43 || 20 || @ Detroit Red Wings || 3–2 || 15–20–8
|- align="center" bgcolor="white"
| 44 || 22 || @ Boston Bruins || 3–3 || 15–20–9
|- align="center" bgcolor="white"
| 45 || 26 || @ Toronto Maple Leafs || 3–3 || 15–20–10
|- align="center" bgcolor="#FFBBBB"
| 46 || 27 || Montreal Canadiens || 5–3 || 15–21–10
|- align="center" bgcolor="#FFBBBB"
| 47 || 31 || @ Montreal Canadiens || 1–0 || 15–22–10
|-

|- align="center" bgcolor="#FFBBBB"
| 48 || 3 || @ Detroit Red Wings || 4–3 || 15–23–10
|- align="center" bgcolor="#CCFFCC"
| 49 || 7 || @ Chicago Black Hawks || 3–1 || 16–23–10
|- align="center" bgcolor="#CCFFCC"
| 50 || 9 || @ Boston Bruins || 4–2 || 17–23–10
|- align="center" bgcolor="#FFBBBB"
| 51 || 10 || Toronto Maple Leafs || 4–3 || 17–24–10
|- align="center" bgcolor="#CCFFCC"
| 52 || 13 || Boston Bruins || 6–2 || 18–24–10
|- align="center" bgcolor="#FFBBBB"
| 53 || 16 || @ Montreal Canadiens || 5–1 || 18–25–10
|- align="center" bgcolor="#CCFFCC"
| 54 || 17 || Montreal Canadiens || 3–2 || 19–25–10
|- align="center" bgcolor="white"
| 55 || 19 || @ Toronto Maple Leafs || 3–3 || 19–25–11
|- align="center" bgcolor="white"
| 56 || 20 || Detroit Red Wings || 1–1 || 19–25–12
|- align="center" bgcolor="#CCFFCC"
| 57 || 24 || Boston Bruins || 5–2 || 20–25–12
|- align="center" bgcolor="#FFBBBB"
| 58 || 27 || Toronto Maple Leafs || 3–1 || 20–26–12
|- align="center" bgcolor="white"
| 59 || 28 || @ Chicago Black Hawks || 2–2 || 20–26–13
|-

|- align="center" bgcolor="#FFBBBB"
| 60 || 1 || @ Montreal Canadiens || 3–1 || 20–27–13
|- align="center" bgcolor="#FFBBBB"
| 61 || 2 || Detroit Red Wings || 6–4 || 20–28–13
|- align="center" bgcolor="#FFBBBB"
| 62 || 4 || @ Boston Bruins || 4–1 || 20–29–13
|- align="center" bgcolor="#CCFFCC"
| 63 || 6 || @ Chicago Black Hawks || 5–3 || 21–29–13
|- align="center" bgcolor="#FFBBBB"
| 64 || 9 || Montreal Canadiens || 2–0 || 21–30–13
|- align="center" bgcolor="#CCFFCC"
| 65 || 12 || Chicago Black Hawks || 10–2 || 22–30–13
|- align="center" bgcolor="#FFBBBB"
| 66 || 15 || @ Toronto Maple Leafs || 5–2 || 22–31–13
|- align="center" bgcolor="#FFBBBB"
| 67 || 16 || Toronto Maple Leafs || 4–2 || 22–32–13
|- align="center" bgcolor="#CCFFCC"
| 68 || 19 || Boston Bruins || 6–4 || 23–32–13
|- align="center" bgcolor="#FFBBBB"
| 69 || 20 || @ Detroit Red Wings || 7–3 || 23–33–13
|- align="center" bgcolor="#FFBBBB"
| 70 || 23 || Chicago Black Hawks || 7–6 || 23–34–13
|-

Playoffs
The Rangers failed to qualify for the 1952 Stanley Cup playoffs.

Player statistics
Skaters

Goaltenders

†Denotes player spent time with another team before joining Rangers. Stats reflect time with Rangers only.
‡Traded mid-season. Stats reflect time with Rangers only.

Awards and records

Transactions

See also
1951–52 NHL season

References

New York Rangers seasons
New York Rangers
New York Rangers
New York Rangers
New York Rangers
1950s in Manhattan
Madison Square Garden